Bahirgachhi Halt railway station is part of the Kolkata Suburban Railway system and operated by Eastern Railway. It is located on the Ranaghat–Gede line in Nadia in the Indian state of West Bengal.

Gallery

References 

Sealdah railway division
Kolkata Suburban Railway stations